Balbriggan (IPA:[ˈbˠalʲəˈbʲɾʲɪɟiːnʲ]) is a coastal town in Fingal, in the northern part of the former County Dublin, Ireland, approximately 34 km north of Dublin City. The 2016 census population was 21,722 for Balbriggan and its environs.

Etymology 
According to P. W. Joyce, the name arises from Baile Breacain [sic], which literally means "Brecan's Town". Brecan is a common medieval first name and there are several other Brackenstowns in Ireland. There is also a possible link to the local Bracken River, in which case the name could derive from breicín, meaning "little trout".

Many locals, however, have traditionally felt that Baile Brigín means "Town of the Little Hills", due to the relatively low hills that surround the town. Although this is now the official Irish name for the town, it is likely to be a folk etymology, back-formed from the English name. Following linguistic logic, however, both with vowels and syllabic stress, this would presume an English name closer to Ballybrig(g)een.

The town's name is more likely derived from the word brecan, as the area was part of a Medieval kingdom known as Brega, populated by a tribe or clan known as the Bregii, and the aforementioned River Bracken.

History 
There is no consensus about when the foundation of the town occurred, other than there may always have been a small settlement of fishermen, weavers and some sort of agricultural trade post.

Medieval battle 
According to Ware, a medieval annalist, a battle took place at Balbriggan on Whitsun-eve, 1329, between the combined forces of John de Bermingham, Earl of Louth (who had been elevated to the 'palatine dignity' of the county) and Richard, Lord of Malahide, and several of their kinsmen, and the forces of local rival families, the Verduns, Gernons and Savages, who were opposed to the elevation of the earl. In this event, the former, with 60 of their English followers, were killed.

18th century 
An 18th-century traveller described Balbriggan as "... a small village situated in a small glin [glen] where the sea forms a little harbour – it is reckoned safe and is sheltered by a good pier. The village is resorted to in Summertime by several genteel people for the benefit of bathing".

Balbriggan rose from a small fishing village to a place of manufacturing and commercial importance in part due to local landowner and judge George Hamilton, Baron of the Court of Exchequer, who, in 1780, established factories to aid in the manufacturing of cotton. He also improved the harbour by building the pier, which was completed in 1763.

19th century 

Lewis's Topographical Directory of Ireland, from 1837, refers to Balbriggan as follows:

A seaport, market and post village and a chapelry, in the parish and barony of Balrothery, county of Dublin, and province of Leinster, 15 miles (N. by E.) from Dublin; containing 3,016 inhabitants.
More than 300 persons are employed in these factories, to which are attached blue dye-works; and in the village and neighbourhood are 942 hand-looms employed in the weaving department. The principal articles made at present are checks, jeans, calicoes and fustians. The village is also celebrated for the manufacture of the finest cotton stockings, which has been carried on successfully since its first establishment about 40 years since; there are 60 frames employed in this trade, and the average production is about 60 dozen per week. There are on the quay a large corn store belonging to Messrs. Frost & Co., of Chester, and some extensive salt-works; and in the village is a tanyard.
The fishery, since the withdrawing of the bounty, has very much diminished: there are at present only 10 wherries or small fishing boats belonging to the port. The village carries on a tolerably brisk coasting trade: in 1833, 134 coal vessels, of the aggregate burden of 11,566 tons, and 29 coasting vessels of 1,795 tons, entered inwards, and 17 coasters of 1,034 tons cleared outwards, from and to ports in Great Britain. The harbour is rendered safe for vessels of 150 tons' burden by an excellent pier, completed in 1763, principally by Baron Hamilton, aided by a parliamentary grant, and is a place of refuge for vessels of that burden at 3/4 tide. Hamilton, proprietor of the village. At the end of the old pier there is a lighthouse.

The Drogheda or Grand Northern Trunk railway from Dublin, for which an act has been obtained, is intended to pass along the shore close to the village and to the east of the church. The market is on Monday, and is abundantly supplied with corn, of which great quantities are sent to Dublin and to Liverpool; and there is a market for provisions on Saturday. Fairs are held on the 29th of April and September, chiefly for cattle. A market house was erected in 1811, partly by subscription and partly at the expense of the Hamilton family. The village is the headquarters of the constabulary police force of the county; and near it is a Martello tower with a coast guard station, which is one of the nine stations within the district of Swords. Petty sessions for the northeast division of the county are held here every alternate Tuesday.

The chapelry of St. George, Balbriggan was founded by the late Rev. G. Hamilton, of Hampton Hall, who in 1813 granted some land and settled an endowment, under the 11th and 12th of Geo. III., for the establishment of a perpetual curacy; and augmentation of £25 per annum has been recently granted by the Ecclesiastical Commissioners from Primate Boulter's fund. In 1816 a chapel was completed, at an expense of £3,018–2s–2d, of which £1,400 was given by the late Board of First Fruits, £478-15s–2d., was raised by voluntary subscriptions of the inhabitants and £1,139-7s–0d., was given by the founder and his family. This chapel, which was a handsome edifice with a square embattled tower, and contained monuments to the memory of R. Hamilton, Esq., and the Rev. G. Hamilton, was burned by accident in 1835, and the congregation assembled for divine service in a school-room until it shall be restored, for which purpose the Ecclesiastical Commissioners have lately granted £480. The living is in the patronage of G. A. Hamilton, Esq.
There is a chapel belonging to the R.C. Union or district of Balrothery and Balbriggan, also a place of worship for Wesleyan Methodists. A parochial school and dispensary are in the village.

Milling 
Balbriggan was the location of the 19th century Smith's Stocking Mill, which made stockings as well as men's "Long-Johns" called Balbriggans. These are often mentioned in John Wayne films – 'he put his balbriggans on' – and both Queen Victoria and the Czarina of Russia also wore "Balbriggans".
Balbriggan's strong textile connections also include the linen & cotton manufacturing of Charles Gallen & Company, which in 1870, purchased the existing weaving mill and associated facilities built by Baron Hamilton. The firm became famous as the finest linen weavers in Ireland and had customers all over the world. They were also suppliers of linens to the Vatican, Embassies of Ireland and the US, and fine hotels worldwide. The business continues today from another location as the old mill in the town centre has been redeveloped.

Sack of Balbriggan 

During the Irish War of Independence, members of the Black and Tans (former British soldiers recruited into the Royal Irish Constabulary (RIC) as special constables) stationed at the nearby Gormanston Camp attacked Balbriggan in reprisal for the murder of an RIC policeman on 20 September 1920. The event, known as the sack of Balbriggan, resulted in the destruction of 54 houses and a hosiery factory along with the looting of four pubs by the Black and Tans. Two residents of Balbriggan, dairyman Séamus Lawless and barber Sean Gibbons, were bayoneted to death by the Black and Tans during the attack. A plaque on Bridge Street in the town commemorates their murder. After it occurred, the attack received international attention due to Balbriggan's close proximity to foreign news correspondents based in Dublin. A delegation from the United States pledged to rebuild thirty homes in the village and a local factory.

Location and access 

Balbriggan is 32 km north of Dublin city, in the northern part of the traditional County Dublin. It lies on the Belfast–Dublin main line of the Irish rail network. Commuter rail services serve Balbriggan railway station, which opened on 25 May 1844 and closed for goods traffic on 2 December 1974. It is estimated that about 2,200 commuters use the station every working day.

The town is also located next to the M1 motorway (the section known as the Balbriggan Bypass), which was completed in 1998. Prior to this, the main Dublin-Belfast road went through the centre of the town, with major traffic congestion on a daily basis.

Bus service is provided by Dublin Bus routes 33, 33A (taken over by Go-Ahead Ireland on 2 December 2018) and 33X as well as Bus Éireann routes 101 (Dublin-Drogheda) and B1 (Balbriggan Town service).

It is the most northerly town in Fingal (although the village of Balscadden lies further north within the county), and is situated close to Bettystown, Laytown (County Meath) and Drogheda (County Louth).

Balbriggan experienced a population boom in the early part of the 2000s as a result of the large demand for housing within the wider Dublin region. The population has increased as a result, with hundreds of new homes being built.

Geography 
The River Bracken, also known as the Matt River, which flows through the town, once formed a lake known locally as "the Canal" or "Head"(of water). The water was sluiced through a canal and tunnels down to the Lower Mill where it turned a waterwheel to drive the cotton manufacturing machinery. The retaining wall of the reservoir collapsed in the 1960s and the area was reclaimed through a land-fill in the early 1980s to create a public park.

On the northern edge of the town, the small Bremore River comes to the sea just beyond the Martello Tower.

Amenities 

The town is coastal and has a sandy beach. It was, at one time, a holiday destination for people from Dublin city.

Balbriggan is also the location of a Sunshine Home which aims to provide a holiday to underprivileged children from the Greater Dublin area. The home is operated by the Sunshine Fund, a unique branch of the Society of Saint Vincent de Paul which provides week-long summer breaks for children aged 7 to 11 from disadvantaged parts of Dublin, Meath, Wicklow and Kildare. The purpose-built home has hosted these holidays since 1935, with over 100,000 young people having passed through their doors.

Economy 

The Department of Foreign Affairs has located a passport production facility in Balbriggan. There is also a proposal to relocate the Drogheda International Seaport to the Bremore Port area to the north of the town. Local development bodies expect that the proposed Bremore Port and orbital motorway projects, as well as the existing M1 motorway and Belfast – Dublin railway, are major draws to prospective companies with large logistical sectors hoping to expand or set up in the Fingal area.

Balbriggan Town Hall served as home to Balbriggan Town Council until the council's dissolution in 2014.

Over the Easter 2008 weekend, precast engineering company Techrete moved their production facility from Howth to Stephenstown Industrial Park with their head office set to follow.

Wavin has been manufacturing plastic pipes in their purpose-built facility in Balbriggan since 1962.

Hosiery fabric
Balbriggan was a well-known hosiery cloth manufacturer. A fine cotton fabric suitable for men's underwear was named after the city. The city prospered as a result of the manufacture of the fabric.

Local government
Balbriggan is a local electoral area of Fingal, electing five councillors to Fingal County Council. It contains the electoral divisions of Balbriggan Rural, Balbriggan Urban, Holmpatrick and Skerries.

Balbriggan had town commissioners under the Towns Improvement (Ireland) Act 1854. This became a town council in 2002. The jurisdictional area of the town was increased in 2009. In common with all town councils, it was abolished in 2014.

It was within the rural district of Balrothery, which was abolished in 1930.

Buildings of note 

 Balbriggan Market House is a 5-bay two-storey building dating from 1811.
 Balbriggan Carnegie Free Library, built c.1905.
 National Irish Bank building, Drogheda Street, built c.1885.
 Balbriggan Court House, built c.1844.
 Balbriggan Railway Viaduct, built c.1843.
 Loreto Convent, built c.1905
 St. Peter and Paul's Church, built in 1842 (Gothic Revival style).
 St. Georges Church, built in 1813 (Gothic Revival style).
 Lighthouse, built in 1761 and listed in the National Inventory of Architectural Heritage (NIAH) with reg. nr.11305017.
 Bremore Castle, built in 14th century and later deteriorated, it has been restored by the Parks Department of Fingal County Council and the Balbriggan and District Historical Society.
 Balbriggan also has a Martello Tower which was built by the British during the Napoleonic Wars. It is one of 29 Martello towers in the Greater Dublin Area

Population 
In 2016, there were 21,601 people residing in Balbriggan, representing an 8.2% increase from the 2011 census. According to the CSO, the town is 63% White Irish and 0.8% Irish Traveller, 16.7% White of any other background, 11.0% Black, 2.8% Asian and 5.7% other racial background or not stated. Approximately 73% of the town's population was born in the Republic of Ireland, and 27% were born abroad. The Polish were by far the largest foreign-born group in 2016, accounting for 5.8% of the town's population (1,270 people).

Balbriggan was also Ireland's "youngest town" in 2016, with an average age of 30.8 years.

Education

Primary 
Balbriggan has a number of primary schools, including several Roman Catholic and Church of Ireland national schools, an Irish-language medium gaelscoil, and several Educate Together schools.

Additional primary schools are located in nearby Balscadden and Balrothery.

Secondary 
There are five secondary schools in the town, including Ardgillan Community College (opened 2009), Bremore Educate Together, Loreto Secondary, Balbriggan Community College and Coláiste Ghlór na Mara (an Irish-language secondary school).

Ardgillan Community College was closed abruptly in October 2018 after adverse fire safety findings. Problems were identified, and are being found, are other schools built by the same Dungannon-based company, Western Building Systems.

Adult education 
Fingal Adult Education Service offers adult education courses both full and part-time.

Sport

Athletics 
Balbriggan and District AC is the local athletic club, with members starting at 6 years old in Little Athletes, and competing from 8 years old up to senior and masters level. The club is all-inclusive and has runners at every level.

Gaelic games 
O'Dwyers GAA is the local Gaelic Athletic Association club which was founded in 1918. The club operates "skills camp"s for underage players (indoors) during winter. The club plays Gaelic football and hurling at several underage levels (girls, boys and mixed). There is also a juvenile camogie team. At the adult level, the club has one football team competing in AFL5 and the Dublin Intermediate Football Championship and one Junior hurling team (AHL9). There are two adult male football teams that play in AFL5 (Junior 1), AFL11N, a Junior Hurling team (AHL5) and a Div 2 Ladies Senior Team.

Soccer 
Balbriggan has a number of association football (soccer) clubs. These include Balbriggan Football Club (formerly known as Clonard Celtic and founded in 1982). This club amalgamated with another club in the area, Balscadden Blues, in the 1990s. Balbriggan F.C. now fields underage teams and three senior teams. The latter play in the Leinster Senior League and work has been completed on a new clubhouse located in Bremore, Balbriggan.

Glebe North Football Club was established in 1945. Several past players with this club have received international honours. The club has two senior teams playing in the Leinster Senior League and 16 schoolboy/girl teams playing in the NDSL Leagues. The club's facilities are located at Market Green, and include a floodlit main pitch and an all-weather pitch.

Hyde Park Football Club and Ringcommon Wanderers Football Club also represent the area. The latter was established in late 1999 and consists of a women's and a men's senior team which play at the Ring Commons Sports Centre.

Balrothery Football Club is the newest club in Balbriggan. This (small) club also uses the Ring Commons sports facilities, which include two soccer pitches, floodlit soccer training areas, an 18-hole Pitch and Putt course, and a rugby pitch. The clubhouse includes a meeting hall, as well as offices, a kitchen, changing rooms, toilets, showers and a bar.

Rugby 
Balbriggan Rugby Football Club was founded in 1925. They field men's and women's teams. The men's team play in the Leinster League, Div.2A and Leinster North East Area League (McGee Cup). The women's team play in Division 2. They also field several underage teams from U7s through to U18s as well as fielding girls' youth rugby teams and special needs rugby teams. The club started the 2007–08 season playing at the new club grounds outside of Balrothery, Co. Dublin next door to North County Cricket Club. The club plans further major development including new pitches and training areas. On Friday 14 November 2008 the 500 Lux Flood Lighting system was turned on for the first time on the main pitch, soon to be followed by the second pitch. The third full-size sand-based all-weather pitch was opened during the 2009–10 season. In 2020, the club opened the highly-anticipated clubhouse: the club’s first permanent clubhouse since its establishment.

Other sports 
Balrothery Balbriggan Tennis Club is a Tennis Ireland member club serving Balrothery, Balbriggan and surrounding areas.

Balbriggan Cricket Club's home ground is in the 'Town Park', beside the Catholic Church.

Balbriggan Golf Club is an 18-hole parkland golf course, about 30 km north of Dublin city, established in 1945, and redeveloped in 2007–09. Ringcommons Pitch & Putt club was established in 1998 and has an 18-hole pitch and putt course.

Religion 
Balbriggan is a Roman Catholic parish in the Fingal North deanery of the Roman Catholic Archdiocese of Dublin. The parish church is the Church of Ss. Peter and Paul, with Mass available in English and Polish. This church features two stained glass windows by Harry Clarke.

In the Church of Ireland structure, Balbriggan forms part of a combined parish with Balrothery and Balscadden. The parish church, on Church Street, is dedicated to St. George.

There are Baptist and Pentecostal congregations which meet on Dublin Street and Hampton Street.

References in literature 
The village is mentioned in James Joyce's short story "The Dead". Gabriel Conroy, the main character/narrator, mentions his brother is a Catholic priest in Balbriggan.

One of the main characters – vampire Cassidy – in Garth Ennis's seminal comic book series 'Preacher' has the fictional biography of being born in Balbriggan in 1900. While not fully established in the comic book series, Cassidy later most-likely became a vampire after being bitten by someone from Skerries.

Jacek, the lead character in the novel "Pantha rhei"  by Kamil Brach, after coming back from the future discovered that his biography had changed. While searching for his "new" past he discovers accidentally that his alter ego from his reality lived with his fiancée in Balbriggan, and his disappearance didn’t go unnoticed. While on the train, near the train station, Jacek sees a poster with his face on and he goes into the city. Looking for information he passes Mill Street. Eventually, he is recognised by a waitress in Molly’s Café.

People of note 

George Hamilton (1732–1793), politician, judge and local landowner, owner of Hampton Hall, who did much to improve the town and harbour of Balbriggan 
George Alexander Hamilton  (1802–1871), MP, civil servant and local landowner, grandson of George Hamilton and like him a noted benefactor of the town 
 Harry Reynolds (1874–1940), first Irishman to win the world championship in cycling in 1896. In 2005 Harry Reynolds Road in Balbriggan was named in his honour.
 Sinéad de Valera (1878–1975), author and wife of former Taoiseach and President Éamon de Valera
 Gertie Shields (1930–2015), founder of "Mothers against Drink Driving" and member of the town council
 Trevor Sargent (1960–present), former leader of the Green Party and Department of Agriculture, Fisheries and Food
 Lesley Roy (1986–present), is a singer/songwriter who represented Ireland at the 2020 and 2021 Eurovision Song Contest
Jordan Doherty , Irish footballer for Tampa Bay Rowdies

Twinning 

Balbriggan is twinned with the following places:
 Belmar, United States
 Sankt Wendel, Germany

See also 
 List of towns and villages in Ireland
 Market Houses in Ireland

References

External links 

Balbriggan.info A local website for residents and visitors, with photos, news, events, shopping, businesses, clubs, leisure, schools, history
Balbriggan.net
Balbriggan Summerfest
Balbriggan Cricket Club

 
Beaches of Fingal
Towers in the Republic of Ireland
Balrothery East
Townlands of Fingal
Populated coastal places in the Republic of Ireland